Two ships of the German Imperial Navy were named SMS S32. They were both torpedo boats built by Schichau-Werke.

 - torpedo boat launched by Schichau on 12 November 1886. Sunk in collision with the torpedo boat  on 17 August 1910. 
 - "large"- or "high-seas"-torpedo boat, launched by Schichau on 28 February 1914. Scuttled at Scapa Flow on 21 June 1919.

References